Jelenje is a municipality in the Primorje-Gorski Kotar County in western Croatia. There are 5,344 inhabitants, with 94.6% Croats.Jelenje has about 425 residents. Jelenje is situated nearby to Lukeži, one notable place in the area is Grad Grobnik.

References

Municipalities of Croatia
Populated places in Primorje-Gorski Kotar County